The Fiat Mobi is a city car produced by the Italian car manufacturer Fiat since 2016; is available exclusively for the South American market. The Mobi hatchback in the A-segment manufactured in Betim, Minas Gerais, Brazil. It was released on 13 April 2016. This Brazilian project was derived from the same platform as the second generation Fiat Uno, in addition to the engine and transmission. 

It was created to be a direct competitor of Volkswagen Up!, with similar dimensions and characteristics, including the rear glass cover in the Up! since 2011.

Background

In November 2014, rumours began about an alleged city car, which was codenamed "Project 341" or "X1H", which would be launched by Fiat in the beginning of 2016. On 13 April 2016, Fiat presented the Mobi's first official prototype, after various images released on the Internet and the information that had already appeared on some automotive magazines, confirming the rumours about this new vehicle.

It replaces the Fiat Mille, and replace the basic version of Fiat Uno called the Vivace and would come to compete with the other market leaders in the A-segment of the market with other models like Volkswagen up! and the Renault Kwid. The "X1H," which would also be derived from the Uno, would share its platform, engine, and transmission.

It is the second smallest Fiat for the South American market, with dimensions even lower than the Fiat Uno and Fiat Palio, only being larger than the Fiat 500. 

The only engine available initially is the four-cylinder FIRE Evo Flex 1.0 75 HP ethanol blend, which yielded 75 hp (55 kW) and 73 hp (54 kW) power at 6250 rpm when fueled with ethanol and gasoline, respectively [source], and 9.9 kgf-m (97 Nm) and 9.5 kgf-m (93  Nm) of torque at 3850 rpm when fueled with ethanol and gasoline, respectively. The FIRE engine was updated in 2022 to comply with PROCONVE L7).

The Mobi initially shipped with a five speed manual transmission, which was replaced with an automated manual gearbox along with the release of a new 1.0L three cylinder Firefly engine. The exterior of Mobi is somewhat similar to that of the Fiat Panda, but has a front grille inspired by Fiat Fullback, Fiat Toro, and Fiat Tipo.

It's offered in three different versions called Mobi Easy, Mobi Easy Pack Top, and Mobi Way, each with different internal and technological features. Prices start at $231.700 Argentinian pesos (around $13,000).

Safety
The Mobi has front disc brakes.

The Mobi in its most basic Latin American version with 2 airbags and no ESC received 1 star for adult occupants and 2 stars for infants from Latin NCAP in 2017.

Sales

References

External links 

 

City cars
Latin NCAP superminis
2020s cars
Cars introduced in 2016
Mobi
Cars of Brazil